The Cyclone-4M is a Ukrainian carrier rocket which is being developed for commercial satellite launches.

History 
The Cyclone-4M is derived from the Tsyklon-4, which started its life as an all-hypergolic three-stage-to-orbit expendable launch vehicle planned for launch from a proposed site at the Alcântara Launch Center in Brazil. However, Brazil backed out of the partnership with Ukraine in 2015, citing concerns over the project budget, the ongoing financial situation in both countries, and the future of the commercial launch market. In March 2017, Canadian company Maritime Launch Services announced plans to begin launching a modified version, the Cyclone-4M, which features a Zenit-derived LOXRP-1 first stage in place of the originally planned R-36 ICBM-based first- and second-stage.

In November 2021, Maritime Launch Services CEO Stephen Matier stated that Nanoracks was to be the first client to fly a payload on the Cyclone-4M.

Design 
This new first-stage design would use four kerolox engines derived from the RD-120 used on the second stage of the Zenit.  The standard RD-120, however, while manufactured in Ukraine, uses a number of Russian-made components which would have to be replaced with Ukrainian-made equivalents.  It is also planned to fit each of these engines with a gimballing mechanism for steering (in the Zenit second stage the RD-120 is fixed to the frame while an RD-8 four-nozzle vernier engine takes care of the steering).

Cyclone-4M is planned for launch from a site in Canso, Nova Scotia. Construction was originally scheduled to begin in 2018, but repeated delays have pushed the start of construction to no earlier than late 2021. The second stage completed qualification tests in October 2019. Construction at Canso finishes in 2024 or 2025; as of December 2022, the maiden flight of Cyclone-4M will take place in 2025. It is planned to launch up to 8 times per year.

References

External links 

Space launch vehicles of Ukraine
Proposed space launch vehicles
Yuzhmash space launch vehicles